The 1985 UC Davis football team represented the University of California, Davis as a member of the Northern California Athletic Conference (NCAC) during the 1985 NCAA Division II football season. Led by 16th-year head coach Jim Sochor, UC Davis compiled an overall record of 9–2 with a mark of 5–0 in conference play, winning the NCAC title for the 15th consecutive season. 1985 was the team's 16th consecutive winning season. With the 5–0 conference record, the team stretched their conference winning streak to 26 games dating back to the 1981 season. The Aggies were ranked No. 1 in the last three NCAA Division II polls. They advanced to the NCAA Division II Football Championship playoffs for the fourth straight year, where they lost to North Dakota State in the quarterfinals. This was the third straight year that North Dakota State eliminated UC Davis in the playoffs. The team outscored its opponents 388 to 191 for the season. The Aggies played home games at Toomey Field in Davis, California.

Schedule

NFL Draft
The following UC Davis Aggies players were selected in the 1986 NFL Draft.

Notes

References

UC Davis
UC Davis Aggies football seasons
Northern California Athletic Conference football champion seasons
UC Davis Aggies football